Recluzia is a genus of small to medium-sized pelagic or planktonic sea snails, marine gastropod molluscs in the family Epitoniidae.

Species
 Recluzia johnii (Holten, 1802)
 Recluzia lutea (Bennett, 1840)
Species brought into synonymy
 Recluzia annamitica Wattebled, 1886
 Recluzia aperta Jeffreys, 1859: synonym of Torellia vestita Jeffreys, 1867: synonym of Torellia delicata (Philippi, 1844)
 Recluzia bensoni A. Adams, 1861: synonym of Recluzia lutea (Bennett, 1840)
 Recluzia effusa Thiele, 1928: synonym of Recluzia lutea (Bennett, 1840)
  Recluzia erythraea Jickeli, 1882: synonym of Recluzia johnii (Holten, 1802)
  Recluzia globosa E. A. Smith, 1876: synonym of Recluzia lutea (Bennett, 1840)
  Recluzia hargravesi Cox, 1870: synonym of Recluzia johnii (Holten, 1802)
 Recluzia insignis Pilsbry & Lowe, 1932 : synonym of  Alora gouldii (A. Adams, 1857)
 Recluzia jehennei Petit, 1853: synonym of Recluzia lutea (Bennett, 1840)
 Recluzia montrouzieri Souverbie, 1871: synonym of Recluzia lutea (Bennett, 1840)
 Recluzia palmeri (Dall, 1871): synonym of Recluzia lutea (Bennett, 1840)
 Recluzia rollandiana Petit de la Saussaye, 1853: synonym of Recluzia lutea (Bennett, 1840)

References

External links
  Beu A.G. (2017). Evolution of Janthina and Recluzia (Mollusca: Gastropoda: Epitoniidae). Records of the Australian Museum. 69(3): 119-222

Epitoniidae